Uprooting is the third studio album from Warsaw Village Band.

Track listing 
Roots: Józef Lipiński (Korzenie: Józef Lipiński) 0:19
In the Forest (W boru kalinka) 3:31
Woman In Hell (Baba w piekle) 2:48
At the Front of the Gates (A przed wroty) 3:31
Polka From the Sieradz Region (Polka z Sieradzkiego) 2:17
Matthew (Mateusz) 2:34
Roots:Janina Zdrzalik (Korzenie: Janina Zdrzalik) 0:35
Let's Play, Musicians! (Hej, zagrajcie, muzykanty) 4:14
The Owl (Sowa) 4:43
Grey Horse (Siwy koń) 3:41
Roots: Kapela Mariana Pełki (Korzenie: Kapela Mariana Pełki) 0:37
When Johnny Went to Fight in the War (A jak pojechał Jaś na wojenkę) 2:47
Lament (Lament) 2:32
I Slayed the Rye (Powałem) 4:14
Roots: Kazimierz Zdrzalik (Korzenie: Kazimierz Zdrzalik) 0:46
Fishie (Rybicka) 3:56

Production: Uli Blass

Recorded: Studio M1 – Polskie Radio 2004

2004 albums
Warsaw Village Band albums